The name Faustus primarily refers to Faust, the protagonist of the German legend.

Faustus may also refer to:

 Faustus (praenomen), a Latin personal name
 Faustus of Alexandria (died 250), priest and martyr
 Faustus of Byzantium, 5th-century Armenian historian
 Faustus of Milan (died 190), soldier and martyr
 Faustus of Mileve, 4th-century Manichean bishop known for his encounter with Augustine of Hippo
 Faustus of Riez, 5th-century bishop
 Faustus (son of Entoria), son of Saturn and Entoria and brother of Janus in Roman mythology
 Faustus, 4th-century martyr executed with Placidus
 Faustus, according to legend fathered incestuously by the 5th-century warlord Vortigern with his daughter
 Faustus, the Last Night, an opera by Pascal Dusapin based on the play by Christopher Marlowe
 Faustus (band), a UK three-piece folk music band
 Faustus (play), a 2004 play by David Mamet
 Victor Faustus (1490–1546), Venetian humanist

See also
 Doctor Faustus (disambiguation)
 Faust (disambiguation)
 Fausto (disambiguation)